5-MeO-DBT (5-Methoxy-N,N-dibutyltryptamine, 5-MeO-BET) is a rare substituted tryptamine derivative, which is thought to be a psychoactive substance and was identified in a designer drug sample by a forensic laboratory in Slovenia in March 2021, although only analytical studies have been conducted and no pharmacological data is available. It is nevertheless controlled under drug analogue legislation in a number of jurisdictions.

See also 
 Dibutyltryptamine
 4-HO-DBT
 4-HO-DSBT
 5-MeO-DET
 5-MeO-EPT
 5-MeO-DPT

References 

Tryptamines
Methoxy compounds